Memories of Murder is a 2003 South Korean crime thriller film directed by Bong Joon-ho, from a screenplay by Bong and Shim Sung-bo, and based on the 1996 play Come to See Me by Kim Kwang-rim. It stars Song Kang-ho, Kim Sang-kyung, Kim Roi-ha, Park Hae-il, and Byun Hee-bong. In the film, detectives Park Doo-man (Song) and Seo Tae-yoon (Kim) lead an investigation into a string of rapes and murders taking place in Hwaseong in the late 1980s.

Development of the film was confirmed in September 2002, after CJ Entertainment purchased the rights to Kim's play, which is loosely based on South Korea's first confirmed serial murders. It is also inspired by detective fiction and elements of Bong's personal life. Principal photography took place across South Korea, including Jangseong County, Haenam County, and Jinju.

Memories of Murder was first theatrically released in South Korea on 2 May 2003, by CJ Entertainment. The film received critical acclaim, with praise for its screenplay, Bong's direction, the performances of its cast (particularly Song's), tone, and editing. It received numerous awards and nominations, and is widely considered one of the best East Asian films ever made.

Plot
In October 1986, two women are found raped and murdered on the outskirts of a small town. Local detective Park Doo-man, not having dealt with such a serious case before, is overwhelmed—evidence is improperly collected, the police's investigative methods are suspicious, and their forensic technology is near non-existent. Park claims he has a way of determining suspects by eye contact. He questions a scarred mentally handicapped boy, Baek Kwang-ho, because he used to follow one of the victims around town. Park uses his eye contact method, thinking Baek is responsible, and has his partner Cho beat confessions out of Baek.

Seo Tae-yoon, a detective from Seoul, volunteers to assist them. However he and Park's methods clash. Seo deems Baek's hands too weak and scarred to be able to commit such an elaborate crime, clearing his name. After more murders are committed, they realize that the killer waits until a rainy night and only kills women wearing red. Officer Kwon Kwi-ok realizes that a local radio station is always requested to play a particular song during the nights the murders are committed.

At the latest crime scene, Park, Cho and Seo arrive separately to investigate, but a local man there masturbates in a woman's red lingerie. Park and Cho apprehend the man, brutally beating him. Seo finds a survivor of the killer with Kwon's help. Upon learning that the killer's hands were noticeably soft, Seo clears the man, as his hands are rough. Infuriated that they lost their suspect, Park scuffles with Seo until Kwon alerts them that the song on the radio is playing. They realize it's raining but arrive too late, finding another woman murdered. Park, Seo and Cho finally decide to work together.

Upon doing an autopsy of the latest victim, they discover pieces of a peach in the body. An address on a postcard sent to the radio station lead them to a factory worker, Park Hyeon-gyu. Seo notes that Hyeon-gyu's hands are soft like the survivor had described. Hyeon-gyu begins to show discomfort when Seo presents the peaches and they think they've found the killer. Cho loses control and beats Hyeon-gyu, prompting the police chief to ban him from the interrogation room. Park and Seo listen to Baek's earlier confession. Seo points out that he talks as if someone else did it and they realize he knew details of the murder because he witnessed it. They go to Baek's father's restaurant, only to discover a drunken Cho there. As people watch news and ridicule police officers, Cho starts a fight. Baek joins the fray, swinging a wooden board at Cho's leg and accidentally piercing it with a rusty nail. Park and Seo chase Baek and question him, but he gets frightened and runs into the path of an oncoming train, where he is struck and killed.

Park learns that Cho's leg will have to be amputated because the nail caused tetanus, leaving him feeling guilty. They discover semen on the clothes of one of the victims, but because of Korea's lack of DNA analysis technology, the sample is sent to the United States to confirm if suspect Hyeon-gyu is the killer. That night, after Seo loses track of Hyeon-gyu while observing him, a young girl is killed. At the crime scene, Seo recognizes the girl as the same schoolgirl he had befriended while investigating. Enraged, he attacks Hyeon-gyu until he is interrupted by Park bringing the results from America. The sample is deemed inconclusive in relation to Hyeon-gyu's DNA. Seo tries to shoot Hyeon-gyu anyway while Park tries to stop him. Seo's bullet narrowly misses Hyeon-gyu, after which the two detectives allow him to leave.

In 2003, the crimes remain unsolved and Park is now a father and businessman. He passes by the first crime scene and stops to view the spot where the victim was found. A young girl tells him about a man she had seen there before who said he was reminiscing about something he had done there a long time ago. Park asks the girl what the man looked like, and she tells him that he had a "normal" face, and was someone who looked very ordinary. The film ends as Park looks straight at the camera, seemingly trying to spot the killer amongst the audience by using his eye contact method.

Cast
Song Kang-ho as Park Doo-man, the lead detective
Kim Sang-kyung as Seo Tae-yoon, a detective from Seoul
Kim Roi-ha as Cho Yong-koo, Park's partner
Song Jae-ho as Sergeant Shin Dong-chul
Byun Hee-bong as Sergeant Koo Hee-bong
Go Seo-hee as Officer Kwon Kwi-ok
Ryu Tae-Ho as Jo Byeong-Sun, the second prime suspect
Park No-shik as Baek Kwang-ho, the initial prime suspect
Park Hae-il as Park Hyeon-gyu, the third prime suspect
Jeon Mi-seon as Kwok Seol-yung, Park Doo-man's girlfriend and then wife
Yeom Hye-ran as So-hyeon's mother

Production

Development
On September 9, 2002, Bong announced the start of filming in a press conference held at the Kumho Museum of Art. During the conference, Bong addressed the difficulties of shooting the film, saying that "even though they avoided the location of the incident, Hwaseong, while filming, it was done carefully since the family of the victims of the real cases were still alive". In an interview with South Korean newspaper Hankook Ilbo in August 2002, regarding the motivation for making the film, he replied that as a fan of detective fiction he "aimed to depict the horror that has not yet been revealed through the emotions evoked through the clash of unmatching concepts of scenic landscapes and grotesque corpses" along with the limitation of the times. The 
conflict framework and the elements of investigation through the usage of FM radio was borrowed from the play Come to See Me, and the scenario was written based on real case reports of the incident as well as personal interviews of the detective who was involved in the case. The film also aimed to reflect his personal reflections from the domestic box office failure of his previous work Barking Dogs Never Bite, which he described as an "enumeration of personal interests".

Filming
Filming took place in Jangseong County, South Jeolla Province and the reed field scene was filmed at Haenam County, South Jeolla Province with cinematography by Kim Hyung-koo. The tunnel scenes were filmed at the Jukbong tunnel located in Jinju.

Music
The production team initially contacted a lot of famous Japanese composers such as Joe Hisaishi, and yet tried to find the right music that would not "overwhelm the film", and later found about Taro Iwashiro. Bong and Iwashiro met each other on two occasions to exchange ideas in 10 hour meetings in Japan and South Korea respectively. Initially over 20 demo tapes were sent to Bong, with some modifications in response to Bong's requests. To reflect the  blank spaces that are intentionally laid on the screens in the frames of the film as well as the missing information in time, the music was composed in "almost connected, yet almost disconnected rhythms". The style of the music was also required to be realistic and to contain themes of memory of the times and murder.

Reception
Within a year of its debut, Memories of Murder was received as a cult film. Later in the decade, it was praised by numerous international publications, referred to as one of the greatest films of 2000s, one of the best crime films ever made, and one of the best South Korean films of all time. On review aggregator website Rotten Tomatoes, the film has an approval rating of 95% based on 76 reviews, with an average rating of 8.20/10. The site's critics consensus reads, "Memories of Murder blends the familiar crime genre with social satire and comedy, capturing the all-too human desperation of its key characters." On Metacritic, the film has a weighted average score of 82 out of 100 based on 15 critics, indicating "universal acclaim". The film won the South Korean film industry's 2003 Grand Bell Award for Best Film, while Bong Joon-ho and Song Kang-ho won the awards for Best Director and Best Leading Actor, respectively.

According to Lathifah Indah of Cultura.id, "Memories of Murder is arguably one of Bong Joon-ho's best movies to watch".

Deeson Thompson of The Washington Post called the film "exciting", while Derek Elley of Variety called it "a powerful, slow-burning portrait of human fallibility".

By the end of the film's domestic run, it had been seen by 5,101,645 people, making it the most watched film during the year 2003 in South Korea. While it was eventually outgained by Silmido, which was released in the same year, most of Silmido'''s audience did not see it until 2004. At the end of the film's run, Memories of Murder was also the fourth most viewed film of all time in the country, after Shiri, Friend and Joint Security Area. The commercial success of the film has been credited as saving one of its production companies, Sidus Pictures, from bankruptcy.Memories of Murder received screenings at several international film festivals, including New Zealand International Film Festival, South Western International Film Festival, Cannes Film Festival, Hawaii International Film Festival, London International Film Festival, Tokyo International Film Festival and San Sebastian International Film Festival, where Bong Joon-ho won the Best Director Award.

Director Quentin Tarantino named it, along with Bong's The Host, one of his Top 20 favorite movies since 1992. It was also chosen as the best Korean film of the century. Sight & Sound included it in their list of "30 key films that defined the decade". It was #63 in Slant Magazine's list of the 100 best films of the aughts.

In 2010, Film Comment listed their top films of the decade based on an international poll of various cinephiles, including filmmakers, critics and academics. Two films directed by Bong Joon-ho were included in the list – The Host (#71) and Memories of Murder (#84).

Release
In 2020, distributor NEON had acquired the rights to restore Memories of Murder. The film came out on Blu-ray on April 20, 2021 and was distributed by The Criterion Collection.

Real life case

While a total body count was never mentioned in the film, at least 10 similar murders were committed in the Hwaseong area between October 1986 and April 1991. This killing spree became known as the Hwaseong Serial Murders.

Some of the details of the murders presented in the movie, such as the killer's gagging the women with their underwear, were taken from the case. As in the film, at the crime scenes, the investigators found bodily fluids suspected to belong to the murderer, but they did not have access to equipment to determine whether the DNA matched suspect DNA until late in the investigations. After the ninth murder, DNA evidence was sent to Japan (unlike the film, where it was sent to America) for analysis, but the results did not match any suspects.

At the time of the film's release, the actual murderer had not yet been caught. As the case was growing close to reaching the statute of limitations, South Korea's leading Uri Party sought to amend the law to give the prosecutors more time to find the murderer. However, in 2006, the statute of limitations was reached for the last-known victim.

More than 13 years later, on 18 September 2019, police announced that a man in his 50s, Lee Choon-jae, had been identified as a suspect in the killings. He was identified after DNA from the underwear of one victim was matched with his, and subsequent DNA testing linked him to four of the other unsolved serial murders. At the time he was identified, he was already serving a life sentence in a prison in Busan for the rape and murder of his sister-in-law.

Lee initially denied any involvement in the serial murders, but, on 2 October 2019, police announced he had confessed to killing 14 people, including all 10 serial murders. Two of the additional four murders happened in Suwon, and the other two happened in Cheongju; as of October 2019, details about the victims have not been released because the investigation is ongoing. In addition to the murders, Lee also confessed to more than 30 rapes and attempted rapes.

After Lee's arrest, Bong Joon-ho commented, "When I made the film, I was very curious, and I also thought a lot about this murderer. I wondered what he look[ed] like." He later added, "I was able to see a photo of his face. And I think I need more time to really explain my emotions from that, but right now I’d just like to applaud the police force for their endless effort to find the culprit.” Lee had watched the film while incarcerated, stating that "I just watched it as a movie; I had no feeling or emotion towards the movie."

Awards and honors

Adaptation
Screenwriter Kim Eun-hee (Sign, Phantom) was attached to a television adaptation with the working title Signal, which aired on tvN in 2016.Gap-dong'', which aired on tvN in 2014, was also loosely inspired by the film.

Bollywood movie Footfairy was also loosely based on the film.

References

External links

Darcy Paquet's review at Koreanfilm.org

Memories of Murder: In the Killing Jar an essay by Ed Park at the Criterion Collection

2000s crime action films
2003 crime drama films
2003 action drama films
2000s mystery drama films
2000s serial killer films
South Korean crime drama films
South Korean mystery drama films
South Korean crime action films
Police detective films
South Korean serial killer films
Crime films based on actual events
Films set in Gyeonggi Province
Films set in the 1980s
South Korean films based on plays
Films directed by Bong Joon-ho
Films with screenplays by Bong Joon-ho
Films scored by Taro Iwashiro
Best Picture Grand Bell Award winners
CJ Entertainment films
2000s Korean-language films
South Korean neo-noir films
South Korean detective films
South Korean films based on actual events
2000s South Korean films